Mnogotochie is a Russian rap band from Moscow. The band performs in gangsta rap, psychedelic rap, and political rap with elements of Russian chanson and rock.  is the unofficial leader of the band and author of its lyrics.

In 1999 Mnogotochie performed at Rap Music 1999, but did not win any prizes. The next year they won the prize at the Micro 2000 fest (Микро 2000) – the same festival where MC L.E. won at the freestyle battle. At the fest Adidas Streetball Challenge 2001, the band won the third place.

The band has released three albums under the "Mnogotochie" name.

In 2006, the band announced their split and later continued performing under two names, DotsFam and Mnogotochie Band (Многоточие Band). While other members of the band frequently changed, Rustaveli remained its only constant member.

Membership 
The group's membership is listed according to the official website as of April 2018.

Mnogotochie Band (Многоточие Band) 
 Rustaveli (Руставели);
 DJ Hassan;
 Sanches (Санчес);
 Grel (Грел) (bass guitar);
 Andrea (Андрэ) (guitar);
 Jeka GoodKoFF (Жэка GoodKoFF) (guitar);
 VictOr (ВиктОр) (keyboards);
 "J"/Lyoha Oryol ("J"/Лёха Орёл) (drums);
 Alexey (Алексей) (saxophone).

Mnogotochie / DotsFam (Многоточие / DotsFam) 
 Rustaveli (Руставели);
 DJ Hassan;
 Sanches (Санчес);
 MC L.E. (Nelegal; Lasha Imanishvilli);
 Dinice(Динайс);
 White Hot Ice.

Past members 
 Kuzmitch (КузьмитчЪ) (MC 1.8; DJ Navvy; Ilya Kuznetsov) — arrangements, lyrics, mc'ing, back vocals, ideas;
 DJ Hassan – arrangements, scratches, remixes (1998—2002);
 King-Kong (Кинг-Конг) (Alexy Piskachev) — rapping ( tracks Heads (Бошки), Who didn't use a chiva (Кто не бахался), Wet place (Мокрое место), Turn (Поворот)) (dead 4 January 2006);
 Grek (Грек) (Anatoly Grechihin) (dead 22 February 2006);
 Tyuha (Тюха) (Andrey Trynov) — arrangements, guitars, design, vocal, lyrics, mc'ing;
 Gena Grom(Гена Гром) — lyrics, mc'ing, back vocals, ideas;
 L.BeeAtch aka Byacha (Бьяча) — lyrics, mc'ing, back vocals;
 Dimon (Димон) (Dmitry Korablin) — arrangements, lyrics, mc'ing;
 Gnom (Гном);
 .

Style 
Since the formation of the collective its members have decided to adhere to strict rules of the chosen line of behavior in creativity and in its implementation. Any attempts to use the name of the collective for dishonest earnings were denied. The organizers of the group's performances were required to prevent photos and videos that were not approved by the band. If this condition was not met, the concert was stopped and the blame for the failure of the concert fell on the organizers. However, this faded into the background over time, as every second viewer had a phone with a photo and video camera with them. During the entire period of creativity, the group did not shoot a single video clip. One of the main principles was to write and rap about themselves had experienced or seen only.

There was a specific dress style of members – leather jacket, trousers, black shoes. This style was picked before black color features of the listener to fully comprehend of lyrics more than colorful clothes distracting of poetry.

The branded style of Mnogotochie himself named kuzminsky style (кузьминским) in honor of the Moscow district where the band was formed.

History

Band formation 
Mnogotochie began to form in Moscow in 1997 when Rustaveli, who wrote lyrics, and DJ Hassan, who made electronic music, became acquainted. Later to him joined schoolmate of Rustaveli Grel as bass guitarist and Kuzmitch as second MC. Next joined guitarist Tyuha. Also joined closest friends of Rustaveli King-Kong and MC L.E.

The date of appearance of the band is considered to be 15 November 1998. This day was made first studio session. The name "Mnogotochie" emphasizes the understatement that sounds in many of their songs, the constant search for new ways of life.

First albums(1998—2002) 
Over time in the band appeared new members – L.BeeAtch, MC L.E., Gena Grom and Dimon. Most of them were about 20 years old at the time. The debut occurred on the festival Rap Music 99 where they performed the song Heads (Бошки). Шт 2000 year at the Fest Micro 2000 (Микро 2000) new member MC L.E. joined the band. The grand Prix of this fest was taken. Next year at the Adidas StreetBall Challenge 2001 was performed the song It happens in life (В жизни так бывает) which soon got into the rotation of some radio stations and became a popular hit. This song was released on the compilation «Street voice-2»(«Голос улиц 2»). But since 2001 Mnogotochie refused to this song and stopped performing it at their performances. Rustaveli commented about it:

In 2001 year at the label «KvadroDisc» («КвадроДиск») was released debut album «Life and freedom» («Жизнь и Свобода»). Musical critics (Billboard Russia, Timeout Moscow, rap.ru) recognized this album one of the best Russian rap albums.

Before 2002 year a band had a producer – Vladimir Ferapontov. The first album didn't make a profit for the band. They were forced to give up the rights to distribute the album for six years. This year was released the second album «Atoms of brain»(«Атомы сознаниЯ») with a track «My heart aches with longing»(«Щемит в душе тоска») became well-known hit. At 2002 year members of Mnogotochie founded record label «Dots Family Records» where released next albums of Mnogotochie and bands, mc's affiliated with it. Also there released hip-hop compilations with different young and well-known hip-hop musicians «Hip-hop kvartal»(«Хип-хоп квартал») и «Rap Experiences»(«Рэп-Опыты»).

«Third Way»(«Третий Путь») (2003—2005) 
«Third Way» is co-project of Mnogotochie with «M.Squad» band from Mitino Moscow district. In 2003 was released LP «Piece Of Life (Five Years Is Equal To...)» («Кусок Жизни (Пяти Годам Равен...)») . As the booklet of LP talks, «Third Way» — is:

This year at fifth anniversary of band was released compilation «Nenomernoy» («Неномерной») consisting of seven remixes from related musicians and six new tracks. According to the interview of Rustaveli this album is not fully functional it lives up to its name – not numbered, it is not third LP of band. This album includes track «Yop-T» («Ёп-т») — first collaboration work of «Mnogotochie» and Mihail Krasnoderevshik («Krasnoe Derevо»).

In 2004 was released «Que 12» («Буриме 12») – the second LP of «Third Way» featuring MC L.E, «Krasnoe Derevо» and band S.S.A.(«Смена Мнений») from Voronezh. In October 2004 was released maxi-single of MC L.E. «In spite of all» consists of 10 tracks (5 remixes) including intro and freestyle. Music was produced by Kuzmitch, Dimon and Kapus.

In early 2005 after seven years of work was released LP «Distances»(«Расстояния») of band «Okna»(«Окна»). It's a project of guitarist Tyuha and female vocalists Farochka in folk-rock style with trip-hop elements including poetry of Marina Tsvetaeva.

Disintegration (2006) 
In May 2006 was released solo album of MC L.E. — «Illegal» supported by Rustaveli, Mihail Krasnoderevshik , Kapus, S.S.A., «Fleur» produced by Kuzmitch and «Fat Complex». Was made a video for track «Someday» featuring S.S.A. («Смена Мнений»). After release returns to the motherland and begin to Russian-language rap in Georgia under the name Illegal.

In December 2006 there were rumors about termination of existence of Mnogotochie. Disintegration was confirmed with an interview of Rustaveli at the official website. Причины, по которым группа свернула свою деятельность, так и остались нераскрытыми. Было лишь заявлено, что КузьмитчЪ ушёл по собственному желанию (позже станет известно что он теперь — DJ Navvy, MC 1.8).

Gena Grom chose to pursue law, interrupting his musical career. MC L.E had to stay in Georgia due to another aggravation of Russian-Georgian relations. Lubov (L.BeeAtch) chose to devote himself to family and 2010 she gave birth to a son. She continues to communicate with other past and current members. Besides that in 2006 two of members passed away – King-Kong (one of the founders of the Band and close friend of Rustaveli) and Grek.

In March 2007 was released third numbered album of «Mnogotochie» — «About the endless of Time»(«За бесконечность Времени»). In fact it was solo work of Rustaveli without any team.

With the departure of Gena Grom as CEO and Kuzmitch as second co-founder label «Dots Family Records» ceased to exist as an LLC. It turns into an independent, unregistered and functioning only for internal projects label.

Activity under new names

DotsFam 
DotsFam (Dots Family) — attempt to restore the band after the breakup by Rustaveli, Dimon, Nelegal (aka MC L.E.) and Mihail Krasnoderevshik. In 2005 beatmaker Dimon makes side project Fat Complex with Anya Rodicheva and Sasha Dzjem Holenko – mix of hard electronic beat with retro samples, live vocals and rapping. Under the patronage of DotsFam new bands arose — «3 Exclamation Marks»(«3 Восклицательных Знака») and «Pili Grims» («Пили Гриммы»). This collectives was included into the first album of DotsFam — Fuckt # 1.

15 September 2009 was released album Zombusiness, was recorded for two years since 2007 year with a break in 2008 because Nelegal came to Georgia during the conflict in South Ossetia. It was planned to shoot a video clip for track «The sin and...» («Грех и...»).

Mihail Krasnoderevshik and Tyuha start to create studio 31records and label «Kidok Production» («Кидок Production») where was recorded album «К.И.Д.О.К.» of his band «Krasnoe Derevo» («Красное Дерево»). Dimon lost the hip-hop and start his own experiments in music. Gnom released solo LP at November 2010 featuring DJ Navvy, Dimon and others members of DotsFam.

In June 2011 was released album «Mirrors» («Зеркала») includes some tracks of Rustaveli and Gnom featuring Shiza(ex-«Siberian sindicate»), Dinice, Marein, Sanches and others. Was shot a video for track «Autumn»(«Осенний») by Mihail Borodin. The shooting took place in Khovrin Hospital. Track «Kukushka» («Кукушка») – cover of Kino band was released at tribute compilation ( «Kinoproby. Rap-tribute».) «КИНОпробы. Рэп-трибьют».

After releasing of «Mirrors» Dimon and Gnom lost DotsFam and joined to M.Squad. Alongside Gnom make his solo album.

In 2019 Rustaveli announced plans about new album of DotsFam featuring Nelegal, Sanches and White Hot Ice.

«Mnogotochie Band» 
«Mnogotochie Band» (DotsBand) — live instrumental band performing classical tracks of Mnogotochie and new tracks of DotsBand, in style called art-rap.

21 December 2011 was released single «Running away from yourself» («Бег от себя»); at the same time, the band is recording their first album. 10 August 2012 was released new single «You're leaving» («Улетаешь ты») .8 March 2013 was released album The Living Truth, featuring ex-member Byacha.

14 September 2014 was published single «Give me fire!» («Дай огня!») and video for it, will included to the next LP. After one month was published track «The years fly by» («Годы летят») feat Mary A. 15 November 2014 was released LP «Under the asphalt sky»(«Под асфальтовым небом»).

29 March 2018 was released second LP «Requiem for reality» («Реквием по реальности»). LP consists of melodic ballads with strong vocal and hard rap manifests.

Since end of 2019 Sanches stopped appearing at the band's concerts; according to Rustaveli reason of it is alcoholism ща Sanches. In September 2020 Rustaveli stopped DotsBand project and plans to resume the activity in 2021 year.

Discography 
This section does not list solo albums by Rustaveli and other members of the band.

Albums

Studio albums

Прочие альбомы

Singles 
В следующей таблице указаны композиции коллектива, которые были опубликованы как синглы, что следует из заявлений авторов или авторитетных СМИ.

Video

Critique 

23 September 2002 website VashDosug.ru:

8 April 2007 Ruslan Munnibaev from Rap.ru, having been to the last concert of band wrote a review:

In May 2007 year Sergey «Sir G» Kurbanov («Банги Хэп» band) in article — «Without compromise» («Без компромиссов»):

24 October 2007 «Soviet youth» newspaper:

Russian «Billboard» 2007:

3 January 2008 «Moscow Komsomolets SPB»:

Soundtracks 
 2005 — «Dust»(«Пыль»)
 2006 — « Khottabych »

Interesting facts 
 Tyuha meet Mnogotochie in 1998 in studio where he came to record first tracks. A friend of Tyuha worked with them and removed all beats (it according to the musician was more important than the same album) by mistake. Tyuha restored them in two nights.
 Before the Mnogotochie Gena Grom was member of band «Berega» with a Frol and Tug. The band had one unreleased LP.
 In 2001 «Molotok» magazine published article about Mnogotochie illustrated it by mistake photo of «Rtut band».
 During the concerts 2003 in Ukraine during the autograph session, almost all the discs that were given for signature were unlicensed.
 in 2007 the state service for control over traffic drugs of Penza town banned from distribution tracks of Mnogotochie band due to the presence of drug promotion in the lyrics.

References

External links 
 Mnogotochie official website
 
 YouTube channel
 profile on the Rap.Ru
 

Musical groups from Moscow
Russian hip hop
Rappers from Moscow
Russian hip hop groups
Russian hip hop musicians